Maciej Musiał (born 11 February 1995) is a Polish actor, and television personality.

Biography
The son of actors Andrzej and Anna Musiał, he began his acting career at an early age with a cameo appearance in a 2004 episode of the long-running Polish soap opera Plebania. He was later cast as a series regular in Ojciec Mateusz (2008–2011), but his big break came with the role in Rodzinka.pl (2011–2020), which established him as a teen idol in Poland. As his popularity continued to grow, he began co-presenting The Voice of Poland, and had a lead role in the feature film My Own Pole, both in 2013. From 2014 to 2015, he studied Philosophy at the University of Warsaw. His work in television earned him the Telekamery award in 2016. He was the ambassador of the World Youth Day 2016 organized in Kraków.

Musiał gained wider recognition outside his native country for starring in the 2018 Netflix series 1983, which he also executive produced. In 2019, he was included for his work on Forbes 30 Under 30 Europe list in the Entertainment category. He had a recurring role in the 2019 Netflix fantasy drama series The Witcher, and in the 2021 Canal+ Premium series Klangor. He graduated with master's degree in Acting from the AST National Academy of Theatre Arts in Kraków in 2021.

Musiał starred in the 2022 Netflix series 1899.

Acting credits

References

External links

Living people
1995 births
Male actors from Warsaw
Polish television actors
Polish male television actors
21st-century Polish male actors
Polish film actors
Polish male film actors
Polish male voice actors
Polish child actors
Polish male soap opera actors
Polish film producers